The 2009 New Zealand Referendum on Child Discipline was held from 31 July to 21 August, and was a citizens-initiated referendum on parental corporal punishment. It asked:
Should a smack as part of good parental correction be a criminal offence in New Zealand?

Voter turnout was 56.1%. 87.4% of votes answered 'no'. The result of the referendum was non-binding and the New Zealand government did not change the law in response to the outcome.

Background 

The petition for the referendum was launched in February 2007 in response to the Crimes (Substituted Section 59) Amendment Bill, which would remove parental correction as a defence for assault against children. The petition was organised by Sheryl Savill with support from Kiwi Party's Larry Baldock. The wording of the petition was approved by Clerk of the House David McGee on 21 February 2007.

The bill, introduced by Sue Bradford, was passed its third reading in Parliament by 113 votes to 7 on 16 May 2007. Meanwhile organisations and individuals led by Larry Baldock continued to collect signatures to initiate a referendum. They fell short by about 15,500 signatures (many were invalid), and they were granted two further months to make up the difference. Eventually the petition attracted 310,000 signatures from voters, surpassing  the 285,000 signatures, or 10 percent of total voters, required to force a referendum.

In June 2008, then prime minister Helen Clark announced that the referendum would not take place alongside the 2008 election as the organisers had been hoping. The decision was based on advice from the Chief Electoral Officer that holding such a referendum could lead to voter confusion. Instead, a postal ballot was selected, starting 30 July 2009 for eligible voters and closing on 21 August 2009.

In June 2009, then Prime Minister John Key said that the government would change the law if it was not working, but that he believed the current law was working well.

Criticism regarding question wording 

The wording of citizens-initiated referendum questions was ultimately the responsibility of the Clerk of the House of Representatives, David McGee. Under the referendum legislation, the wording of the question is required to "convey clearly the purpose and effect" of the referendum.

The referendum question was interpreted by some to assume that "a smack" can form part of "good parental correction". Murray Edridge, Chief Executive of Barnardos New Zealand, claimed that the question "presupposes that smacking is part of good parental correction" which he described as "a debatable issue". Prime Minister John Key described the question as "ambiguous" and pointed out that it "could be read a number of different ways". Leader of the Opposition Phil Goff expressed concern that the question "implies that if you vote 'yes' that [sic] you're in favour of criminal sanctions being taken against reasonable parents – actually nobody believes that."

Both John Key and Phil Goff stated that they did not intend to vote in the referendum, with Key calling the question "ridiculous". The Prime Minister believed turnout would be low.

Sue Bradford introduced a private member's bill, the Citizens Initiated Referenda (Wording of Questions) Amendment Bill, designed to prevent future citizens-initiated referenda from having poorly worded questions, and the National government considered adopting it.

On this bill, she wrote:
An example of an approved referendum question that is both leading and misleading is the NZ Referendum on Child Discipline 2009 proposed by Larry Baldock.

The question approved for that referendum "Should a smack as part of good parental correction be a criminal offence in New Zealand?" is leading in that the use of the word "good" before "parental correction" makes a value-judgment which predetermines the answer. People answering the question will be drawn to answer "no" on the basis that what is "good" cannot be criminal. 

Caritas Aotearoa New Zealand has made this argument:
Mr Smith says the upcoming referendum will not provide clarity on the question of child discipline, because it is possible to support the 2007 amendment while voting either Yes or No to the referendum question: Should a smack as part of good parental correction be a criminal offence in New Zealand?

However, Caritas recognises that in the political context of the referendum, a 'Yes' vote is seen to be a vote for the status quo, while a 'No' vote is seen to be a vote against the 2007 amendment.

"In this context, we recommend a 'Yes' vote, as we believe the status quo is close to the position that we recommended to the Select Committee. However, the wording of the question is so ambiguous, many New Zealanders who support efforts to reduce violence against children, may in good conscience still feel obliged to vote 'No'. It will be hard to understand what the outcome of the referendum may mean," says Mr Smith.

He says Caritas will be writing to the Prime Minister and other relevant politicians, expressing concern that the ambiguous nature of the question will result in an outcome that cannot be understood as either supporting or opposing the 2007 amendment.

Campaigns

The "yes" campaign
Most front-line child welfare organisations, such as Plunket Society, Barnardos, Save the Children, Unicef, Women's Refuge, CPAG, Epoch and Jigsaw, believed the referendum question was misleading, and encouraged their supporters to vote "yes". These organisations, along with many others, backed "The Yes Vote" campaign. Māori Party co-leader Pita Sharples and Green Party co-leader Russel Norman wanted the current law retained, with Norman adding he would vote Yes.

The "no" campaign
The "Vote NO" campaign website was launched on 22 June 2009. The campaign was supported by Simon Barnett. ACT leader Rodney Hide said he would vote no, believing parents have the right to lightly smack their children. Family First and The Kiwi Party also supported voting 'no'.

Results

Nationwide

By electorate

Aftermath

Government response
Prime Minister John Key promised to bring forward the planned review of the law.

John Boscawen's private member's bill
By coincidence, Government coalition and ACT MP John Boscawen had a private member's bill legalising smacking drawn from the ballot less than a week after the referendum. Prime Minister John Key said his National Party would vote it down, with the Labour Party and Green Party also opposed making it likely to be lost after the first reading of the bill. In September 2010 the Bill was in fact defeated 115–5 on its first reading in Parliament.

Binding referendum
Dissatisfied with the government's response, the Kiwi Party has put forward another referendum to make referendums legally binding. The question "Should Parliament be required to pass legislation that implements the majority result of a citizens initiated referendum where that result supports a law change?" was approved by the Clerk of the House on 17 December 2009. However, the petition failed to gain sufficient signatures and subsequently lapsed.

Public protests
A protest against prime minister John Key's response to the referendum was held on Saturday, 21 November 2009 in Auckland. The New Zealand Herald estimated that between 4,000 and 5,000 people attended.

2017 election
On 24 March 2017 it was reported that New Zealand First and Winston Peters would take to the election a policy of repealing the anti-smacking law passed by the last parliament despite overwhelming public opposition. They went on to state that they would not enter any coalition or confidence and supply agreement with a party that wished to ignore the public's clearly stated view in a referendum on that issue after the 2017 New Zealand general election. New Zealand First went into government following the election and no changes were made to the law.

Opinion polls
Note: Percentage figures are rounded.

See also
Crimes Act 1961, the Act that was amended
Crimes (Substituted Section 59) Amendment Act 2007 the amending Act
Crime in New Zealand
Corporal punishment in the home

References

External links
Elections New Zealand – 2009 Citizens Initiated Referendum
The Yes Vote campaign
The Vote No campaign

Corporal punishment referendum, 2009
Referendums in New Zealand
Corporal punishment referendum, 2009
Cor
Cor
Corporal punishment law
Youth in New Zealand
Spanking
August 2009 events in New Zealand